St Peter's College Boat Club (SPCBC) is the rowing club for members of St Peter's College, Oxford. Founded in 1929, it is now based in the University College Boathouse on the southern bank of The Isis (River Thames), The Boat Club competes in Torpids and Summer Eights bumps races in Oxford.

History

Early days
St Peter's College Boat Club was established in the year of St Peter's Hall's foundation, in 1929. With only 40 undergraduates in the entire year group of 1929-30 and most of them without previous rowing experience, they still improved their position on the river, both in Torpids and in Eights. The St Peter's Master, Christopher Chavasse, was a dominant influence. He encouraged all activities which could help the Hall's reputation, in particular sport. Chavasse and the College Bursar, Toby Tinne, an Old Etonian and one-time rowing Blue, were the team's coaches.

The club acquired its very first boat in the second year of its existence and named it St Peter of Galilee, in spirit of the evangelical mainspring of the Hall's foundation. As St Peter's Hall could not afford its own College Barge to store equipment and kit, it used one of the Salter's Barge instead. 

The Thirties were a good period for rowing at St Peter's. The immediate predecessors had gone through the other colleges' second and third boats in the lowest division at the rate of a bump a day. 1936 saw the second boat, on the first day, scoring an exceedingly rare double over-bump: five places gained in one afternoon. And in the Reading 'Head' the First Eight finished sixth - equal with Bristol University who were twenty-first on the Tideway a fortnight later. Hilary 1937, saw the college boat getting smashed, when it went over Iffley Weir. Having to row in a hired, very much older and heavier tub from Salters Streamers they went down each day of Torpids. The recovery set in during 1938 (1st VIII winning blades). 

During the Second World War, smaller colleges were grouped together to enable them to compete in inter-collegiate events. In 1940, Pembroke, Corpus and St Peter's boated together.

Post-War
Two St Peter's boats competed in the first post-war Torpids and Summer Eights in 1946. The Bursar C. E. Tinne was still coaching, "bicycling, megaphone in hand, and bawling instructions anywhere between Sandford and the end of Port Meadow", and the Boat Club moved with their fleet into the old OUBC boathouse.

In the 1950s, the oarsmen of St Peter's Hall enjoyed significant success and their Hall had a strong reputation for sporting achievement. The club entered up to six boats in each regatta. For the first time a St Peter's Torpid entered the First Division in 1950.  In 1955, the First Torpid went up 6 places, ending up as number 6 in the First Division (where they stayed for two years). In Eights Week the College's five boats achieved a total of eighteen bumps without being bumped with the First Boat ending up as number 1 in the Second Division. Both finish results are now regarded as the highest achievement of a St Peter's First Torpid resp. First Eight.

In the 1960s, the club used the facilities at the OUBC boathouse as well as Abingdon Boys School.

Bump Suppers, still not a regular tradition at college, were only held celebrating a blade winning crew as it happened in 1972 for the Schools (Second) Eight. This Bump Supper saw the burning of two old Eights in front of Hennington Hall, the erection of a brick stone wall in front of the chapel's entrance, an attempt to colour the Christ Church pond purple and an encounter with the local police.

1979 saw the first admission of women to the College. In the same year, one Torpid and two Eights were entered for the St Peter's Ladies Boat Club.

Recent years
In 1999, the Victorian listed University Boathouse burned down and with it SPCBC's entire fleet, memorabilia like trophy blades as well as archive material of the club.  Later identified as arson, the loss of the boathouse put the club into a devastating situation and it took the club over five years to rebuild its fleet but only by severe cut backs in the quality of its boats. 2007 saw the opening of new University Boathouse, which replaced the older boathouse on the same site.

In 2008, St. Peter’s Men’s Novice A boat beat six other men’s A crews and one B crew to win Christ Church Regatta for the first time in the club's history. In Torpids 2009, SPCBC finished not only with two sets of blades (5 and 6 bump blades for M1 and M2) but +15 net bumps, and five competing crews which is the most the club has put out since 1998. 2009 saw the Men's 1st VIII also winning the novice plate event at Bedford Amateur Regatta.

In 2010, SPCBC was the Most successful Club in Torpids. With 9 bumps for two women’s boats and with 14 bumps altogether St Peter’s climbed up the bump charts.  2011 saw the Men's First Eight winning the Novice Division at Bristol Head and coming 245th in the Head of the River Race ahead of several other Oxford Colleges. In 2012, the men's side won the Worcester Sprint Regatta in a coxed four. In 2013, SPCBC won Oriel Regatta as well as the Senior Women's event in the New College Indoor Regatta.

Since 2015 St Peter's Men's 1st Eight has been awarded two sets of spoons and is now on the lowest position on The River since 1931. SPCBC's Men's 1st Torpid suffered a similar fate. Since 2017 the crew finds itself on the lowest position on The River since 1930.

St. Peter's Women's 1st Eight won blades in Summer Eights 2019, 27 years after the last time this happened. SPCBC's Women's 1st position in Torpids 2019 is the highest since 2008.

2016

Torpids

Eights

2017

Torpids

Eights

2018

Torpids

2019

Torpids

Eights

Facilities and training

St Peter's College Boat Club shares the boathouse with University College, Somerville College and Wolfson College. The building is owned by University College and won a Royal Institute of British Architects prize. 

All members have free access to the University Gym as well as the Jonny Fraser gym in college, which houses 8 ergos and free weights. The men's squad uses facilities at Radley College's boat house.

Governance and funding 
The club is run by a students committee, consisting of a President, the Men's and Women's Captains of Boats, Captain of Coxes, Treasurer, Secretary, Safety Officer and Alumni Officer. Members of the committee hold office for one year, starting on Sunday of Sixth Week of Trinity Term – the day after the last day of Eights Week. St Peter's College uses a proportion of student fees to fund social and sporting activity.

Alumni
Notable St Peter's oarsmen include Mark Stanhope, former Bishop of Oxford John Pritchard, former World Champion Mike Blomquist and Karl Hudspith (4 time 'Blue' and 2012 OUBC President).

References

Bibliography

External links
 Official website for SPCBC
 Oxford Bump Charts

Rowing clubs of the University of Oxford
Boat club
1929 establishments in England
Sports clubs established in 1929
Rowing clubs in Oxfordshire
Rowing clubs of the River Thames